Southside is an unincorporated community in Mason County, West Virginia, United States. Southside is located near the Kanawha River south of Leon. It is currently served by U.S. Route 35, but will be bypassed once the planned upgrading of that route into a four-lane highway is complete.

Located near Southside are the Couch-Artrip House and Elm Grove, both of which are listed on the National Register of Historic Places.

References

Unincorporated communities in Mason County, West Virginia
Unincorporated communities in West Virginia
Populated places on the Kanawha River